Cape Flattery is a cape in northern Queensland approximately  north of Cooktown, Queensland.  The headland was named by James Cook on 10 August 1770 as he charted the eastern Australian coast.

Silica mine
Cape Flattery is the location of the world's biggest silica mine.  The mine was established in 1967 and was severely damaged by Cyclone Ita in 2014.

The cape's local port is used for the shipping of silica sand from a local subsidiary of Mitsubishi Corporation, and exports the most silica sand internationally, with 1.7 million tonnes exported alone in 2007–08.

References 

Flattery
Ports and harbours of Queensland
Landforms of Far North Queensland